Rosenmeier is a German surname. It is derived from the words rosen (rose) and meier (farmer, cutter, tender). It is more commonly used in Denmark, where it has been present since the 1600s.

Notable people with the surname include:
 Christian Rosenmeier, Danish-American politician
 Erik Rosenmeier, American football player for the Buffalo Bills
 Gordon Rosenmeier, American politician and son of Christian
 Peter Rosenmeier, Danish table tennis player, Paralympic gold medalist

German-language surnames